John Gordon "Gord" Perrin  (born 17 August 1989) is a Canadian volleyball player. He plays club volleyball for Russian club Ural Ufa, and was a two–time Turkish Champion (2013, 2015). Perrin is a retired member of the Canada men's national volleyball team, participating in two Olympic Games (Rio 2016 & Tokyo 2020), as well as winning gold at the 2015 Men's NORCECA Volleyball Championship.

Personal life
Perrin was born in Creston, British Columbia to Dave Perrin and Ruth Boehmer. He has one brother, Marshall, and two sisters, Joan and Alicia, who played volleyball for the Canadian national women's team. He attended Thompson Rivers University from 2007 to 2010.

Career

University
Perrin was a member of the Thompson Rivers University Wolfpack men's volleyball team for three seasons from 2007 to 2010. During his time there, he helped the team win bronze in the 2008 CIS Men's Volleyball Championship, finishing the tournament as a tournaments all-star, and for the 2009-10 season, Perrin was named Thompson Rivers University athlete of the year.

Club
For the 2011/12 season, he signed with Turkish club Arkas Spor, helping the club finish runners up in the national championship in his first season. During his time in Turkey, he helped the team win the Turkish Men's Volleyball League twice, in 2013 and 2015, as well as being awarded the Best Server award for the 2013/2014 season. In addition to domestic success, Perrin also helped the team finish a record high of 4th place in the CEV Champions League.

In 2015, Perrin signed with Volley Piacenza in Italy, but his season was cut short due to a surgery required to fix a torn left meniscus in March 2015. For the 2016/17 season, he signed with Polish club Asseco Resovia Rzeszów, reuniting him with fellow national team member Gavin Schmitt. In April 2017 Perrin extended a contract with Asseco Resovia Rzeszów, and he wanted to continue his career in PlusLiga. In July 2017 he talked publicly about his moving to Chinese league despite the currently signed contract with Resovia. The club did not want to cancel their agreement and applied to FIVB on blocking unprofessional situations when a player wants to void already signed contract without previous fulfillment. Perrin broke agreement and went to Beijing Volleyball.

National team
Perrin was a member of the Canada men's youth national team in 2006. With the team, they finished 4th at the Boys' Youth NORCECA Volleyball Championship. Two years later, he joined the Canada men's junior national volleyball team, and helped the team finish second at the 2008 Men's Junior NORCECA Volleyball Championship.

He joined the senior Canada men's national volleyball team program in 2011. He has been a member of every FIVB World League squad since 2012, helping the team finish a national team record 5th place in 2013. He was also member of the squad that finished a national team record 7th place at the 2014 FIVB Volleyball Men's World Championship, and he helped the team win bronze at the 2015 Pan American Games. In addition to all this, Perrin also helped the team win bronze at the 2011 NORCECA Championship, silver at the 2013 NORCECA Championship, and gold at the 2015 NORCECA Championship.

Perrin was a member of the squad that finished 5th at the 2016 Summer Olympics. In June 2021, Perrin was named to Canada's 2020 Olympic team. At the Summer Olympics in Tokyo, the Canadian team finished 4th in their group, qualifying them for the quarterfinals. In the quarters, they lost to Russia (Russian Olympic Committee), 3-0.

Perrin announced he was retiring from the national team in November 2021.

Sporting achievements

Clubs
 FIVB Club World Championship
  Brazil 2019 – with Sada Cruzeiro
 CSV South American Club Championship
  Contagem 2020 – with Sada Cruzeiro
 CEV Challenge Cup
  2018/2019 – with Belogorie Belgorod
 National championships
 2011/2012  Turkish Championship, with Arkas İzmir
 2012/2013  Turkish Championship, with Arkas İzmir
 2014/2015  Turkish Championship, with Arkas İzmir
 2017/2018  Chinese Championship, with Beijing Volleyball
 2019/2020  Brazilian Cup, with Sada Cruzeiro

Youth national team
 2008  NORCECA U21 Championship

Individual awards
 2008: NORCECA U21 Championship – Best Blocker
 2013: Turkish Championship – Best Server
 2015: NORCECA Championship – Best Outside Hitter

References

External links
 
 
 Player profile at PlusLiga.pl 
 Player profile at Volleybox.net 

1989 births
Living people
Sportspeople from British Columbia
Canadian men's volleyball players
Pan American Games medalists in volleyball
Pan American Games bronze medalists for Canada
Volleyball players at the 2015 Pan American Games
Olympic volleyball players of Canada
Volleyball players at the 2016 Summer Olympics
Canadian expatriate sportspeople in Turkey
Expatriate volleyball players in Turkey
Canadian expatriate sportspeople in Italy
Expatriate volleyball players in Italy
Canadian expatriate sportspeople in Poland
Expatriate volleyball players in Poland
Canadian expatriate sportspeople in China
Expatriate volleyball players in China
Canadian expatriate sportspeople in Russia
Expatriate volleyball players in Russia
Canadian expatriate sportspeople in Brazil
Expatriate volleyball players in Brazil
Thompson Rivers WolfPack volleyball players
Resovia (volleyball) players
Medalists at the 2015 Pan American Games
Volleyball players at the 2020 Summer Olympics
Outside hitters